Żabikowo may refer to the following places in Poland:

Żabikowo, Środa Wielkopolska County
Żabikowo, Luboń
Żabikowo Prywatne
Żabikowo Rządowe